Perry Johnson may refer to:

Perry Johnson (sprinter) (1924–1999), Bermudian sprinter
Perry Johnson (ice hockey) (b. 1977), Canadian ice hockey player
Perry Johnson (politician), a businessman and candidate in the 2022 Michigan gubernatorial election